General elections were held in Malaysia on Saturday, 19 November 2022. The prospect of snap elections had been considered high due to the political crisis that had been ongoing since 2020; political instability caused by coalition or party switching among members of Parliament, combined with the fallout of the COVID-19 pandemic, contributed to the resignation of two prime ministers and the collapse of each of their respective coalition governments since the 2018 general elections.

The term of the 14th Parliament was due to expire on 16 July 2023, five years after its first meeting on 16 July 2018. However, the Yang di-Pertuan Agong (King of Malaysia), Abdullah of Pahang, dissolved parliament at the request of Prime Minister Ismail Sabri Yaakob on 10 October 2022. Constitutionally, the elections were required to be held within 60 days of the dissolution, making 9 December the last possible polling day.

Historically, general elections for all state legislative assemblies of Malaysia except Sarawak had been held concurrently as a cost-saving measure. However, the states could dissolve their own legislatures independently from Parliament, and several states (Sabah, Malacca and Johor) had held early elections due to the political instability, disrupting their usual electoral cycle. The governments of these states and Sarawak indicated that they would not be holding state elections concurrently. The governments of several other states, primarily those under a Pakatan Harapan or Perikatan Nasional government, stated that they would prefer to complete a full term. By 19 October, all Pakatan-led states, Penang, Selangor and Negeri Sembilan, as well as Perikatan-led states, Kedah, Kelantan and Terengganu, already confirmed not to be dissolving their state legislatures.

The elections were the first in which 18–20-year-olds were eligible to vote, following a constitutional amendment to reduce the voting age from 21 to 18. Additionally, all voters were automatically registered, so the electorate expanded by around six million people or 31%.

Results for 220 out of all 222 contested seats in the Dewan Rakyat were announced by the morning of 20 November 2022, although polling in the constituency of Padang Serai was postponed until 7 December due to the death of the Pakatan Harapan candidate, Karuppaiya Muthusamy, three days before the elections. Voting in Baram was suspended on polling day due to flooding and inclement weather preventing polling workers from reaching the polling stations, and was instead completed on 21 November.

The elections resulted in a hung parliament, the first federal election to have had such a result in the nation's history. Pakatan Harapan remained the coalition with the most seats in the Dewan Rakyat albeit with a reduced share, with its largest losses in Kedah. Perikatan Nasional swept the northwestern and east coastal states of Peninsular Malaysia in a landslide, winning every seat in the states of Perlis, Kelantan and Terengganu, and all but one in Kedah; dubbed by many people as "Green Wave" (Malay: "Gelombang Hijau"). The historically dominant Barisan Nasional fell to third place, having lost most of its seats to Perikatan Nasional. A number of well-known incumbent MPs also lost their seats, including former Prime Minister Mahathir Mohamad in Langkawi (who also lost his deposit), former Finance Minister Tengku Razaleigh Hamzah by a razor thin margin in Gua Musang, Trade Minister and former Selangor's Menteri Besar (the state's head of government) Azmin Ali in Gombak, former Housing Minister Zuraida Kamaruddin in Ampang, former Domestic Trade Minister Saifuddin Nasution Ismail in Kulim-Bandar Baharu, as well as the children of Anwar Ibrahim and Mahathir Mohamad respectively, Nurul Izzah Anwar and Mukhriz Mahathir. Both former Ministers of Federal Territories, from BN and PH, Tengku Adnan Tengku Mansor and Khalid Abdul Samad were defeated, in Putrajaya and Titiwangsa respectively. Incumbent Finance Minister and Senator Tengku Zafrul Aziz failed to win a seat in the Dewan Rakyat for Kuala Selangor by a slim majority, as well as the son-in-law of Abdullah Ahmad Badawi who is also the Health Minister Khairy Jamaluddin also failed to defeat the Pakatan Harapan candidate by a slim majority too in Sungai Buloh.

After obtaining support from Barisan Nasional, Gabungan Parti Sarawak, the Heritage Party, Malaysian United Democratic Alliance, Parti Bangsa Malaysia and independent MPs, Pakatan Harapan chairman Anwar Ibrahim was appointed and sworn in as Prime Minister on 24 November 2022 by the Yang di-Pertuan Agong. Gabungan Rakyat Sabah also expressed support for Anwar, while Perikatan Nasional opted to become the official opposition.

Background

Previous election 

The 2018 federal election resulted in a change in government for the first time in Malaysian history since direct elections were first held in 1955. Pakatan Harapan, then a centre-left coalition between four parties, won 113 seats in the Dewan Rakyat (a two-seat majority) against the right-wing Barisan Nasional coalition, which won 79 seats. Pakatan Harapan entered government at the federal level with support from the Sabah Heritage Party. The concurrent state elections also saw Pakatan Harapan winning a majority for the first time in Johor, Malacca and Negeri Sembilan. Hung parliaments were recorded in Kedah, Perak and Sabah, but changes in party membership of the legislators after the election allowed Pakatan Harapan (or the Sabah Heritage Party in Sabah) to enter government in these states as well.

Significant events 
In July 2019, the Constitution (Amendment) Act 2019, which contained provisions to lower the voting age to 18 and allow for the automatic registration of voters, was enacted by Parliament. The Election Commission announced in June 2020 that preparations for these changes would be ready by July 2021. The 2022 election marked the first in which the 18–20 age group is entitled to vote.

Since losing re-election in 2018, former prime minister Najib Razak was put on trial, convicted and imprisoned in relation to the 1MDB scandal. The scandal severely impacted UMNO in the previous election and has a continuing legacy in Malaysian politics. Trials and investigations remain ongoing.

The COVID-19 pandemic in Malaysia emerged as a major health crisis from early 2020.  It had significant impacts on Malaysia's economy and society.

2020–22 political crisis 

A political crisis began in Malaysia in early 2020, leading to the resignation of two prime ministers and significant shifts in parliament over the subsequent two years. In late February 2020, a majority of the 32 members of the Malaysian United Indigenous Party withdrew from the governing Pakatan Harapan-led coalition, causing it to lose its majority in the Dewan Rakyat, and partnered with Barisan Nasional. Prime Minister Mahathir Mohamad then resigned, creating a power vacuum in the executive branch. This movement later became known as Sheraton Move. On 1 March, Muhyiddin Yassin was appointed Prime Minister, and a Malaysian United Indigenous Party-led minority government was formed under new coalition Perikatan Nasional, with confidence and supply from Barisan Nasional. Political instability continued after this, exacerbated by the impact of the COVID-19 pandemic. The crisis escalated in mid-2021, leading to Muhyiddin losing parliamentary support over the COVID-19 response and resigning. On 20 August 2021, Ismail Sabri Yaakob was appointed Prime Minister as his replacement.

This political instability led to calls for a snap general election from various lawmakers, and there was speculation that one would be held since 2020. In June 2022, Ismail Sabri said he would not delay the dissolution of parliament, amid continued pressure from his party UMNO to hold a general election as soon as possible. He said he would consult with his allies in the Barisan Nasional alliance on the date, as well as leaders of his party UMNO. Ismail Sabri announced the dissolution on 10 October 2022.

Electoral system 

Elections in Malaysia are conducted at the federal and state levels. Federal elections elect members of the Dewan Rakyat, the lower house of Parliament, while state elections in each of the 13 states elect members of their respective state legislative assembly. As Malaysia follows the Westminster system of government, the head of government (Prime Minister at the federal level and the Chief Ministers, the so-called , at the state level) is the person who commands the confidence of the majority of members in the respective legislature – this is normally the leader of the party or coalition with the majority of seats in the legislature.

The Dewan Rakyat consists of 222 members, known as Members of Parliament (MPs), that are elected for five-year terms. Each MP is elected from a single-member constituency using the first-past-the-post voting system. If one party obtains a majority of seats, then that party is entitled to form the government, with its leader becoming the Prime Minister. In the event of a hung parliament, where no single party obtains the majority of seats, the government may still form through a coalition or a confidence and supply agreement with other parties. In practice, coalitions and alliances in Malaysia generally persist between elections, and member parties do not normally contest for the same seats.

In July 2019, the Constitution (Amendment) Act 2019 was enacted that provided for the voting age to be lowered to 18 and for automatic registration of voters. Previously, the voting age was 21 although the age of majority in the country was 18. Automatic voter registration and the lowered voting age simultaneously came into effect in early 2022, with this election being the first federal election with the expanded electoral franchise. Malaysia does not currently practice compulsory voting. The Election Commission is under the jurisdiction of the Prime Minister's Department.

In late 2022, several news outlets and publishing companies began launching apps and websites to announce the upcoming GE15 results and news.

Timeline

Dissolution of parliament 
The 14th Parliament of Malaysia was dissolved on 10 October 2022, during a special televised address by Prime Minister Ismail Sabri Yaakob, following an audience with the Yang di-Pertuan Agong, Abdullah, a day prior, whereby he provided consent for the dissolution. The election had to be held within 60 days or by 9 December.

The Constitution of Malaysia requires that a general election be held in the fifth calendar year after the first sitting unless it is dissolved earlier by the Yang di-Pertuan Agong following a motion of no confidence, loss of supply or a request by the Prime Minister.

Dissolution of state legislatures 
While any state may dissolve its legislature independently of Parliament, most of them had historically dissolve at around the same time as Parliament such that federal and state elections are held simultaneously. In accordance with Malaysian law, Parliament as well as the legislative assemblies of each state would automatically expire on the fifth anniversary of the first sitting of a term, unless dissolved prior to that date by the relevant heads of state on the advice of their respective heads of government. Elections must be held within sixty days of expiry or dissolution.

Pre-nomination events 
On 17 October 2022, the Election Commission of Malaysia (SPR) updated the roster of 63 parties and coalitions eligible to contest in its own right. Independents are allowed to contest using symbols predefined by the SPR.

Timetable

Last election pendulum 
(Results and status at 9 May 2018) The 14th general election witnessed 124 governmental seats and 98 non-governmental seats filled the Dewan Rakyat. The government side has 49 safe seats and 11 fairly safe seats, while the other side has 21 safe seats and 4 fairly safe seats.

Political parties and candidates

The election saw numerous changes in seats from all political sides, with candidates either announced to be departing from their original constituencies to contest in another constituency, or several high-profile members of parliament being dropped from selection. Those who were dropped or not selected however went on to contest as independent candidates or in opposing parties to defend their seats or seek re-election, resulting in their memberships dropped.

UMNO deputy president Mohamad Hasan announced his intention to contest the Rembau seat, replacing incumbent Khairy Jamaluddin, who was expected to be fielded in an opposition-majority seat, which eventually turned out to be Sungai Buloh, one of the seats that has been a PKR stronghold. In addition, several high-profile incumbent UMNO MPs, including Shahidan Kassim, Annuar Musa and Tajuddin Abdul Rahman, were dropped from contesting following rumors after they were believed to be supporting Ismail Sabri instead of Zahid Hamidi. Among those dropped, Zahidi Zainul Abidin, the incumbent Padang Besar MP, contested as an independent while Shahidan contested to defend his Arau seat under the Perikatan banner, resulting in both their and several others' memberships dropped. In a similar move, incumbent PAS Tumpat MP Che Abdullah Mat Nawi contested to defend his seat under the BN ticket after he was dropped from the candidates' list, resulting in him expelled from PAS.

A few of the more notable changes in PKR were Anwar's decision to contest in the Tambun parliamentary seat, with Wan Azizah Wan Ismail contesting the Bandar Tun Razak seat, as part of PKR's plan to field high-ranking members in seats previously held by defected party members. One of the most anticipated seats, Gombak, saw Selangor's Menteri Besar Amirudin Shari nominated as PH candidate to face incumbent Azmin Ali, who was one of the key ringleaders of the ongoing political crisis. PKR also announced several other high-profile direct candidates to contest under the PH banner. Former Batu MP Tian Chua, who was not selected to contest in favor of incumbent Prabakaran Parameswaran, sought to seek re-election by contesting as an independent candidate for his seat, leading to his expulsion from the party.

Meanwhile, DAP had dropped two of its incumbent MPs, Charles Santiago and Wong Tack from their respective parliamentary seats, in place of younger candidates, leading both to question the party's reasoning behind their droppings, with Wong later announcing his intention to defend his seat as an independent candidate, thus also resulting in his expulsion from the party.

On 16 November, Padang Serai's incumbent MP Karupaiya Mutusami died three days before the election. This marked the third time in Malaysian election history that a nominated candidate died in between nomination and polling dates. The Election Commission announced that polling for Padang Serai would take place on 7 December following a meeting on Friday (18 November), a day before the elections, after polling for the constituency was postponed. Subsequently, PN candidate for the Tioman state seat in Pahang, Yunus Ramli died hours before polling was due to begin on 19 November. The election for the state seat was also postponed to the same date with Padang Serai.

Parties represented in current legislatures 
The election would be the first time Pakatan Harapan, Gabungan Parti Sarawak, Gabungan Rakyat Sabah and Perikatan Nasional use their own respective logos.

DAP announced their intention to use the PH logo for West Malaysia seats on 14 November 2021, while they would continue to use their own logo in Sarawak as they did in the previous election and also in the recent state election. However, DAP stated that they would be joining other PH parties in using the PH logo in Sabah, in contrast to using their own logo in the previous election, the 2019 Sandakan by-election and using then-ally Warisan's logo in the 2020 Sabah state election. In September 2022, Pakatan formally decided to consider applications by MUDA and the Socialist Party of Malaysia (PSM) to contest under its name. Pakatan chairman Anwar Ibrahim later stated that the coalition would form an electoral pact with the two parties, citing that the application process would need to go through the Registrar of Societies. However, on 30 October, PSM announced that they ended their pact with PH, after they were denied being allocated seats for the election, in particular Sungai Siput where chairman Michael Jeyakumar Devaraj served two terms but was similarly allocated to PKR in 2018. Therefore, PSM decided to contest alone on 2 November 2022

PN component parties in Pahang (Bersatu, PAS, Gerakan) decided to contest on all parliamentary and state assembly seats there on 28 November 2021. The Malaysian Islamic Party (PAS), despite being in the PN coalition, announced that they would be contesting using their own logo in Kelantan, Terengganu and Kedah along with other PN candidates in these three predominant Malay/Muslim states. The move was met with objection from GERAKAN, as their policy was to not contest under other party's logo. Some of PN component parties are also part of Gabungan Rakyat Sabah, who intended to use GRS logo in Sabah. Parti Kesejahteraan Demokratik Masyarakat (KDM), a GRS-friendly party initiated by former Warisan Party members, sought to contest at least three seats in Sabah independently.

In August 2022, Pejuang formed a Malay/Muslim-based coalition called as Gerakan Tanah Air (GTA) with 4 other parties (Berjasa, Putra, Gagasan Bangsa and IMAN) and planned to contest 120 parliamentary seats. Mahathir, who initially hesitated to contest until he changed his mind to defend his Langkawi seat, announced that GTA would be contesting under the Pejuang logo, while GTA contestants in Kelantan contested using the logo of Parti Bumiputera Perkasa Malaysia (PUTRA), as the coalition's registration was still pending.

Barisan Nasional contested all parliamentary seats outside Sarawak, while respecting Sabah state liaison office's intention to cooperate with Gabungan Rakyat Sabah. On 11 December 2021, PBRS announced that they would contest 3 seats in Sabah under Barisan Nasional. In April 2022, UMNO's Supreme Council proposed that Prime Minister Ismail Sabri Yaakob be its Prime Ministerial candidate for GE15. Zahid Hamidi, chairman of Barisan Nasional, has officially considered to accept Makkal Sakti's request to contest the election under Barisan Nasional logo on 19 September 2021. The offer was extended to other Friends of BN parties by June 2022. Gabungan Parti Sarawak, whose component parties were part of BN in 2018 election, formulated its election program and competed independently. GPS postponed any coalition and government formation talks until after election and claimed to maintain the status quo of seat allocation.

In this election, the Heritage Party (WARISAN), previously an ally of Pakatan Harapan in the 2018 general election, for the first time contested outside Sabah. As part of the move, it intended on 24 January 2021 to contest all parliamentary and assembly seats in Penang and considered to run in other states.

Extra-parliamentary parties 
On 15 December 2021, a group of independent activists calling themselves Gerak Independent announced their intention to run in the election in no more than 10 seats. Parti Bumi Kenyalang (PBK) initially intended to contest all 31 parliamentary seats in Sarawak on 26 January 2022, claiming that it already made ties with unspecified Sabah based party and still opened possibility of cooperating with other Sarawak-only parties. By June 2022 PBK made negotiations with Sarawakian local opposition parties such as PSB, Aspirasi, PBDS (Baru) and SEDAR to avoid clashes in the election without formally forming a coalition. The negotiation produced a cooperation pact between PSB, PBK and PBDS, with PBK contesting mostly under PSB's logo. In June 2022 SEDAR announced their intention to contest in Malay/Muslim (and Melanau)-majority of Sarawak seats.

Parti Rakyat Malaysia announced their intention to contest parliamentary seats in Penang respectively on 15 October 2022. PRM later stated that it would contest 28 parliament and 1 state seats nationally, in cooperation with GERAK 98 NGO.

Parti Cinta Sabah, Penang Front Party and Sarawak People's Aspiration Party initially declared to their intention to participate but ended up not fielding any candidate.

Nominated candidates 
The election saw a record 945 candidates contesting in all 222 parliamentary seats nationwide, among them a record 108 independent candidates.

Campaign

Timing of election 
Opposition politicians, political analysts and online commentaries criticised the decision to hold the election at the end of 2022 instead of early 2023, which coincides the annual year-end monsoon season. As Malaysia was already recovering from serious flooding from the previous year, opposition politicians accused the ruling government for being inconsiderate towards flood victims. This condition was also seen by opposition parties as a deliberate tactic to discourage a high voter turnout that could potentially benefit opposition parties. In response, UMNO president Ahmad Zahid Hamidi, who remarked that the election was to proceed despite concerns of nationwide floods, accused opposition parties as "cowards" and "wanting them to buy time" to garner extra support, further adding that his remarks were taken out of context. Despite these remarks, authorities began preparations in the event flooding occurs during polling day.

The decision to dissolve parliament early was also seen by several other opposition politicians as an attempt to prevent more BN politicians from being charged with corruption, or in an effort towards pardoning jailed politicians such as former prime minister Najib Razak who was found guilty for his role in the 1MDB scandal. This was evidenced by a video online showing Zahid Hamidi speaking at a Malaysian Indian Congress (MIC) general meeting in which he warned other BN politicians that they would be the next ones to be charged should BN lose the election. Prime Minister Ismail Sabri Yaakob said he dissolved Parliament because it was impossible to go on some issues, and that UMNO was pushing for it ever since BN won big in the 2022 Johor state election in March.

Youth vote 
The 2022 election was the first Malaysian federal election in which the voting age is over 18 as opposed to over 21 previously. Around 6 million new voters, either young or previously unregistered, are expected to participate in the election. The 18–20 age group represents 1.39 million first-time voters, and voters aged 18–39 account for about 50% of Malaysia's 21 million registered voters.

Outgoing members of parliament 
The seats of Gerik and Batu Sapi were left vacant due to the deaths of their respective MPs, Hasbullah Osman (BN-UMNO) and Liew Vui Keong (WARISAN) in 2020. By-elections were due to be held, but did not materialise due to the declaration of the state of emergency during the COVID-19 pandemic in 2021. The declarations were later revoked by the Yang di-Pertuan Agong following the dissolution of parliament.

Opinion polls

Results

By alliance

By parliamentary seats

State assemblies

Seats that changed allegiance

Aftermath

Formation of federal government 
In the general election, no individual alliance won the required 112 seats needed for a majority in the Dewan Rakyat to form the next government.

On 20 November, Pakatan Harapan (PH) leader Anwar Ibrahim claimed to have negotiated a majority to form the next government, but refused to mention which other parties were cooperating. Meanwhile, Gabungan Parti Sarawak (GPS) leader Abang Johari said that his party would work together with Perikatan Nasional (PN), Barisan Nasional (BN) and Gabungan Rakyat Sabah (GRS) to form the government. PN leader Muhyiddin Yassin also claimed to have a sufficient majority to be appointed as Prime Minister, citing support from PN, BN, GPS and GRS. However, BN leader Ahmad Zahid Hamidi said that BN had not negotiated with GPS or PN on forming a government with BN, while also stating that BN MPs already agreed to let him decide who BN would ally with to form a government.

On 21 November, PH leaders and BN leaders met at the Seri Pacific Hotel. Also on 21 November, the deadline for political parties to prove their majority in Parliament to form a government and nominate a prime minister was extended for 24 hours by the Yang di-Pertuan Agong, shifting the deadline to the next day. Meanwhile, Hamzah Zainudin of PN said that PN submitted over 112 statutory declarations from MPs supporting Muhyiddin for Prime Minister.

On 22 November, Ismail Sabri Yaakob of BN stated that BN would not support either PH or PN to form a government and was prepared to sit in opposition. Meanwhile, after discontent from Sarawak over GPS working with PN, GPS stated that it was up to the Yang di-Pertuan Agong to appoint the Prime Minister; while Parti Warisan voiced support for a government with PH and BN. Also that day, the royal palace stated that after the Yang di-Pertuan Agong reviewed the nominations for prime minister, he found that "no member of parliament has the majority support to be appointed prime minister", so the Yang di-Pertuan Agong summoned Anwar and Muhyiddin to meet him. After the meeting, Muhyiddin said that the Yang di-Pertuan Agong proposed a unity government between Pakatan Harapan and Perikatan National, but Muhyiddin rejected it as Perikatan National "will not cooperate" with Pakatan Harapan; while Anwar acknowledged that the prime minister had yet to be determined, while stating that "given time, I think we will secure a simple majority".

On 23 November, the Yang di-Pertuan Agong met with BN and GPS leaders in the royal palace. Meanwhile, some members of BN and PN met in St Regis Hotel.

On 24 November, Ahmad Maslan of UMNO stated that the party's supreme council has agreed to follow the wishes of the Yang di-Pertuan Agong for BN to join a unity government not led by PN. Meanwhile, Perikatan Nasional would consider forming a unity government, stated its secretary-general Hamzah Zainudin; while GRS leader Hajiji Noor stated that GRS would abide by the Yang di-Pertuan Agong's wishes on forming a new government, including if a unity government was formed. Also, DAP secretary-general Anthony Loke publicly apologised on behalf of his party to the Sarawak government and Sarawak people for any offensive statement by a DAP leader, while DAP chairman Lim Guan Eng apologised as well for "my remarks that may have offended the Sarawak Premier and the GPS Sarawak state government", calling for "a fresh start to cooperate together".

Later on 24 November, the royal palace announced that PH chairman Anwar Ibrahim was appointed as Prime Minister by the Yang di-Pertuan Agong, Al-Sultan Abdullah, after the Agong conducted a consultation with the Conference of Rulers of Malaysia. Anwar was sworn in at 5 pm that day, making him Malaysia's 10th Prime Minister. However, Muhyiddin continued to insist that he had the support of a majority of 115 MPs to form the next government and called on Anwar to prove Anwar's majority; this led to former Prime Minister Najib Razak calling for Muhyiddin himself to prove his 115 MP majority. As of 24 November, Anwar has received support from MPs from PH, BN, GPS, Warisan, MUDA and PBM, as well as independent MPs. Anwar has pledged to hold a vote of confidence on 19 December 2022, once MPs are sworn into Parliament.

On 25 November, both Anwar and GRS leader Hajiji Noor stated that GRS had joined the unity government, supporting Anwar; this resulted in Anwar becoming the first prime minister since Abdullah Ahmad Badawi in 2008 to have two-thirds majority support in Parliament. Meanwhile, Muhyiddin congratulated Anwar and acknowledged him as Prime Minister, thanked Anwar for inviting PN to join the unity government, and declined Anwar's invitation, stating that PN would play the role of a "credible opposition" to ensure "corruption-free governance".

Anwar Ibrahim received the vote of confidence of the parliament on 19 December.

International reactions 
Following the formation of unity government and the appointment of Anwar as prime minister, spiritual leader Dalai Lama, organisations such as the European Union, the United Nations, as well as various head of states and their representative including from Afghanistan, Australia, Austria, Bahrain, Bangladesh, Brazil, Canada, China, East Timor, Finland, Germany, India, Iran, Japan, Maldives, New Zealand, Pakistan, Qatar, Russia, Saudi Arabia, Somalia, South Korea, Sri Lanka, Sudan, Taiwan, Turkey,  
the United Arab Emirates, the United Kingdom, the United States, and Yemen sent their congratulatory messages.

Some of the head of states of neighbouring ASEAN countries also congratulated Anwar:

: The Sultan of Brunei, Hassanal Bolkiah, sent a congratulatory message to Anwar Ibrahim on 25 November 2022. In the message, he expressed confidence that Anwar's leadership and integrity would allow Malaysia to enjoy "continuous development" for the prosperity of its people, and conveyed his desire to further strengthen the close relations between the two countries.
: The President of Indonesia, Joko Widodo, personally congratulated Anwar Ibrahim through a telephone call on 24 November 2022. Jokowi expressed his wish to meet Anwar "as soon as possible" while Anwar reiterated that Indonesia has been "Malaysia's true ally", further adding that the two countries should continue to deepen economic and cultural cooperation.
: The President of the Philippines, Bongbong Marcos extended his well wishes to Anwar Ibrahim through a tweet, describing the latter as his good friend and looking forward to the stability that Anwar's leadership provides for Malaysia as well as for the whole ASEAN region.
: The Prime Minister of Singapore, Lee Hsien Loong, sent a congratulatory letter to Anwar Ibrahim on 24 November 2022, shortly after the Istana Negara confirmed Anwar's appointment as the new Prime Minister. In the letter, Lee congratulated his Pakatan Harapan coalition for their "strong performance" in the election, and noted the "longstanding substantive relationship" between the two countries, adding that the two countries could "do much more together to enhance openness, stability and connectivity" in their bilateral relationship. On 25 November, Lee called Anwar to reiterate his congratulations, and invited him to visit Singapore soon; in return, Anwar replied to Lee on Twitter that he would be looking forward to meeting him "at the earliest opportunity".
: The Prime Minister of Thailand, Prayut Chan-o-cha, sent a congratulatory message on 4 December 2022 to Anwar on becoming the 10th Prime Minister of Malaysia. In the message, Prayut was looking forward with Anwar to further enhance bilateral relations between the two countries in both regional and international levels. Earlier, the Deputy Prime Minister of Thailand and Health Minister, Anutin Charnvirakul posted a congratulatory message with a video of him and Anwar through his official Facebook account on 26 November 2022. In his message, he wish "may the dual relationship of our two countries soar greater than ever before".
: The Prime Minister of Vietnam, Pham Minh Chinh, sent a message of congratulations to Anwar on 25 November 2022.

See also
 2022 Malaysian state elections
 2022 Perlis state election
 2022 Perak state election
 2022 Pahang state election
 2022 Bugaya by-election
 2018 Malaysian general election
 2020–2022 Malaysian political crisis

Notes

References

External links 
Electoral Commission of Malaysia

Malaysia
general election
Malaysia
General elections in Malaysia
Election and referendum articles with incomplete results